Lissodrillia schroederi is a species of sea snail, a marine gastropod mollusk in the family Drilliidae.

This species is the type species of the genus Lissodrillia Bartsch & Rehder, 1943 as stated by Turgeon et al., 1998

Description
The shell grows to a length of 7.8 mm.

Distribution
This species occurs in the Gulf of Mexico off Western Florida at depths between 9 m and 110 m.

References

 Bartsch, Paul, and Harald A. Rehder. "New turritid mollusks from Florida." Proceedings of the United States National Museum (1939).
 Rosenberg, G., F. Moretzsohn, and E. F. García. 2009. Gastropoda (Mollusca) of the Gulf of Mexico, pp. 579–699 in Felder, D.L. and D.K. Camp (eds.), Gulf of Mexico–Origins, Waters, and Biota. Biodiversity. Texas A&M Press, College Station, Texas

External links
 

schroederi
Gastropods described in 1939